The following is a list of places named after Saint Joseph.

Brazil

Canada
 St. Joseph in Antigonish County, Nova Scotia
 St. Joseph in Digby County, Nova Scotia
 St. Joseph Island, Ontario, Canada
 St. Joseph Township
 Fort St. Joseph (Ontario), former British outpost on St. Joseph Island
 Several places called Saint-Joseph in Quebec
Lac-Saint-Joseph, Quebec
Saint-Joseph-de-Beauce, Quebec
Saint-Joseph-de-Coleraine, Quebec
Saint-Joseph-de-Kamouraska, Quebec
Saint-Joseph-de-Lepage, Quebec
Saint-Joseph-des-Érables, Quebec
Saint-Joseph-de-Sorel, Quebec
Saint-Joseph-du-Lac, Quebec
 St. Joseph's, Saskatchewan hamlet in south east Saskatchewan
 St. Joseph's Colony, Saskatchewan in west central Saskatchewan
 St. Joseph Island, a Canadian island in Lake Huron

Caribbean
 Saint Joseph (Trinidad and Tobago)
 The Parish of Saint Joseph, Barbados
 Saint Joseph Parish, Dominica
 Île Saint-Joseph, the southernmost island of the three Îles du Salut in the Atlantic Ocean off the coast of French Guiana

France
 Saint-Joseph, Loire
 Saint-Joseph, Manche
 Saint-Joseph, Martinique
 Saint-Joseph, Réunion
 Saint-Joseph-de-Rivière, in the Isère département
 Saint-Joseph-des-Bancs, in the Ardèche département
 Saint-Joseph AOC, an Appellation d'Origine Contrôlée in the Rhône wine region

India
 Sao Jose de Areal, Salcette, Goa

Mexico
San José Chiapa
San José de Gracia (disambiguation), several places
San José Iturbide
San José Teacalco
San Jose del Cabo

Philippines
 San Jose, Batangas
 San Jose, Camarines Sur
 San Jose, Dinagat Islands
 San Jose, Negros Oriental
 San Jose, Northern Samar
 San Jose, Nueva Ecija
 San Jose, Occidental Mindoro
 San Jose, Romblon
 San Jose, Tarlac
 San Jose de Buan, Samar
 San Jose de Buenavista, Antique
 San Jose del Monte

Central America
 San José, Costa Rica, capital city of Costa Rica

United States
 San Jose, California
 St. Joseph, Florida (disambiguation)
 St. Joseph Bay, a bay on the Gulf Coast of Florida
 St. Joseph Peninsula, a peninsula or spit on the Gulf Coast of Florida
 St. Joseph Point, the end of the St. Joseph Peninsula in Florida
 St. Joseph Sound, a bay in Pinellas County, Florida
 St. Joseph, Illinois
 St. Joseph Township, Champaign County, Illinois
 Saint Joseph, Indiana (disambiguation)
 St. Joseph County, Indiana
 St. Joseph Township, Allen County, Indiana
 St. Joseph, Kansas
 St. Joseph, Louisville, Kentucky
 St. Joseph, Louisiana
 St. Joseph, Michigan
 St. Joseph Charter Township, Michigan
 St. Joseph County, Michigan
 St. Joseph, Minnesota
 St. Joseph Township, Kittson County, Minnesota
 St. Joseph Township, Stearns County, Minnesota
 Saint Joseph, Missouri
 St. Joseph Township, Pembina County, North Dakota
 St. Joseph Township, Williams County, Ohio
 Saint Joseph, Oregon
 San José Island (Texas), a barrier island on the Texas coast in the United States, also known as "St. Joseph Island"
 St. Joseph, Wisconsin
 Saint Joseph, Milwaukee, a neighborhood of Milwaukee, Wisconsin
 St. Joseph River (Lake Michigan) in southwest Michigan and northwest Indiana
 St. Joseph River (Maumee River) in south central Michigan and northeast Indiana
 St. Joseph Valley Parkway, carrying parts of U.S. Routes 20 and 31

Churches
 St. Joseph's Church (disambiguation), numerous

Hospitals
 St. Joseph Medical Center (disambiguation), numerous

Lists of eponyms
Lists of places named after saints
Lists of place name etymologies
Saint Joseph (husband of Mary)